Oberea komiyai is a species of beetle in the family Cerambycidae. It was described by Kurihara and Ohbayashi in 2006.

References

Beetles described in 2006
komiyai